The 1949 Wake Forest Demon Deacons baseball team represented Wake Forest College in the 1949 NCAA baseball season.  The team was coached by Lee Gooch in his second season as head coach at Wake Forest.

The Demon Deacons reached the College World Series, finishing as the runner up to Texas.

Roster

Schedule

References

Wake Forest
Wake Forest Demon Deacons baseball seasons
College World Series seasons
Wake Forest Baseball
Southern Conference baseball champion seasons